Chihuahua Fútbol Club is a Mexican professional football team based in Chihuahua, Chihuahua that will play in the Liga Premier de México starting in the 2022–23 season.

History
In the summer of 2020 UACH F.C. was put on hiatus due to financial problems as a result of the impact of COVID-19, leaving Chihuahua City without a professional football team. Subsequently, some initiatives arose to return football to the city, especially through the purchase of a franchise in the Liga de Expansión MX, however, there was no agreement to finalize the purchase of a new team.

After the failure of the initial plans, the owners of Grupo Xoy Capital obtained the franchise belonging to UACH F.C., which had been on hiatus since 2020 and shared the city with Chihuahua F.C. In May 2022 the new team was officially presented.

Stadium

The Estadio Olímpico Universitario José Reyes Baeza is a multi-use stadium in Chihuahua, Chihuahua, Mexico.  It is currently used mostly for football, American football and concerts.  The stadium holds 22,000 people.

Players

Current squad

Reserve teams
Chihuahua F.C. (Liga TDP)
Reserve team that plays in the Liga TDP, the fourth level of the Mexican league system.

References

Chihuahua City
Football clubs in Chihuahua (state)
Association football clubs established in 2022
Sports teams in Chihuahua City
2022 establishments in Mexico